Feast, Food & Love, also known as Party, Food & Love, is a cookbook co-compiled by Swedish author Camilla Läckberg and chef Christian Hellberg.

Swedish cookbooks
2011 non-fiction books